The Global Reporting Initiative (known as GRI) is an international independent standards organization that helps businesses, governments and other organizations understand and communicate their impacts on issues such as climate change, human rights and corruption. GRI provides the world's most widely used sustainability reporting standards (the GRI Standards).

Under increasing pressure from different stakeholder groups – such as governments, consumers and investors – to be more transparent about their environmental, economic and social impacts, many companies publish a sustainability report, also known as a corporate social responsibility (CSR) or environmental, social and governance (ESG) report. GRI's framework for sustainability reporting helps companies identify, gather and report this information in a clear and comparable manner. First launched in 2000, GRI's sustainability reporting framework is now the most widely used by multinational organizations, governments, small and medium enterprises (SMEs), NGOs and industry groups in more than 90 countries. In 2017, 63 percent of the largest 100 companies (N100), and 75 percent of the Global Fortune 250 (G250) reported applying the GRI reporting framework.

The most recent of GRI's reporting frameworks are the GRI Standards, launched in October 2016. Developed by the Global Sustainability Standards Board (GSSB), the GRI Standards are the first global standards for sustainability reporting and are a free public good. In contrast to the earlier reporting frameworks, the GRI Standards have a modular structure, making them easier to update and adapt.

History 
The GRI was formed by the United States-based non-profits Ceres (formerly the Coalition for Environmentally Responsible Economies) and Tellus Institute, with the support of the United Nations Environment Programme (UNEP) in 1997. It released an "exposure draft" version of the Sustainability Reporting Guidelines in 1999, the first full version in 2000, the second version was released at the World Summit for Sustainable Development in Johannesburg—where the organization and the guidelines were also referred to in the Plan of Implementation signed by all attending member states. Later that year it became a permanent institution. In 2002 GRI moved its secretariat to Amsterdam, Netherlands. Although the GRI is independent, it remains a collaborating centre of UNEP and works in cooperation with the United Nations Global Compact.

Governance 
The "GRI" refers to the global network of many thousands worldwide that create the reporting framework, use it in disclosing their sustainability performance, demand its use by organizations as the basis for information disclosure, or are actively engaged in improving the standard. And examples of good sustainability reporting practices include digitalization of organizations’ supply-chain management, communication strategies and stakeholder relation mechanisms, and implementation of two-way communication strategies that enable sensemaking and sensegiving conjointly.

The network is supported by an institutional side of the GRI, which is made up of the following governance bodies: board of directors, stakeholder council, technical advisory committee, organizational stakeholders, and a secretariat. Diverse geographic and sector constituencies are represented in these governance bodies. The GRI headquarters and secretariat is in Amsterdam, Netherlands.

Reporting guidelines

Standards for guidelines 
The GRI framework aims to enable third parties to assess environmental impact from the activities of the company and its supply chain.  The standardized reporting guidelines concerning the environment are contained within the GRI Indicator Protocol Set. The performance indicators (PI) includes criteria on energy, biodiversity and emissions. There are 30 environmental indicators ranging from EN1 (materials used by weight) to EN30 (total environmental expenditures by type of investment).

The  3.1 guideline was updated by the materiality-based 4.0 guideline in 2014, resulting in some commentary regarding comparability.

ESG metrics 

Sustainability reporting aims to standardize and quantify the environmental, social and governance costs and benefits derived from the activities of the reporting companies accordingly. Some of the examples of the reporting measures to be used would be the quantified results of the  emissions, working and payment conditions, financial transparency and alike.

For the assessment of the social impact created by the reporting organization, GRI standards were created according to international labor practices and the environmental impact by conducting an independent audit. ISO 14010, ISO 14011, ISO 14012 and ISO 26000 set out a standard for assessing the environmental impact, while OHSAS 18001 lays down a health and safety risk management system. For instance, the ILO's eight core conventions outline specific groups or population that require special attention: women, children, migrant workers and their families, persons belonging to national or ethnic, linguistic, and religious minorities, indigenous peoples, and persons with disabilities. In order to circumvent "greenwashing" or falsified reporting, the financial institution can conduct an independent audit of the investee or enter into a dialogue with the top management of the company in question.

Data Partners
GRI's Data Partners collect and process information about GRI reporting and sustainability reporting in general. They regularly share data with GRI about reports and reporting organizations, and also serve as on-the-ground hubs, identifying reporting trends in their countries and regions. The report and organization related information provided by Data Partners is added to GRI's Sustainability Disclosure Database.

The GRI data partners' analysis of reports show an increase in GRI reporting worldwide. The official GRI data partner in The United States, The United Kingdom and The Republic of Ireland—The Governance & Accountability Institute,

The reporting standards set by the GRI ESG assessment and reporting were developed based on principles set in OECD guidelines for Multinational corporations and UN Guiding Principles.

European Commission Directive 
In December 2014, EC has adopted a new directive obliging large multinational corporations to provide non-financial disclosure to the markets. The law applies to public companies with more than 500 employees. Companies that would provide such a reporting would be required to report on environmental, social and employee-related, human rights, anti-corruption and bribery matters. Additionally, these large corporations would be required to describe their business model, outcomes and risks of the policies on the above topics, and the diversity policy applied for management and supervisory bodies. The reporting techniques are encouraged to rely on recognized frameworks such as GRI's Sustainability Reporting Guidelines, the United Nations Global Compact (UNGC), the UN Guiding Principles on Business and Human Rights, OECD Guidelines, International Organization for Standardization (ISO) 26000 and the International Labour Organization (ILO) Tripartite Declaration.

Controversy 
In 2020 GRI decided to discontinue its sustainability disclosure database. The publicly available database had over 63,000 reports spanning nearly 20 years from hundreds of companies. The reports listed in this database are still available from  company websites, however.

See also
 Integrated reporting
 Mervyn King (judge)
 Sustainability accounting
 Sustainability marketing
 Sustainability reporting
 The Amsterdam Global Conference on Sustainability and Transparency
 Triple bottom line
 UN Global Compact
 Multistakeholder governance

References

External links
 Official site
 Official site of GRI's Exclusive US, UK, and Ireland Data Partner Governance & Accountability Institute
 Global Reporting Initiative Standards and their benefits to Companies 

Economics of sustainability
Auditing
Social responsibility organizations
Sustainability metrics and indices